Robert Doffell Sasser (born March 9, 1975 in Philadelphia, Pennsylvania) is an American former professional baseball player. He was drafted by the Atlanta Braves in the 10th round of the 1993 MLB draft. Sasser currently serves as hitting coach for the Kannapolis Intimidators.

In 2012, Sasser joined the Kannapolis Intimidators as batting coach. The Kannapolis Intimidators are the Single-A farm club in the Chicago White Sox minor league chain. Young players generally one year out of high school or college become Kannapolis Intimidators. The White Sox also have affiliates in Bristol, VA (Rookie), Great Falls, MT (Short Season), Winston-Salem, NC (A-Advanced), Birmingham, AL (AA), and Charlotte, NC (AAA). The 2011 Kannapolis Intimidators finished the season with an overall record of 76-62.

References

External links

1975 births
Living people
African-American baseball coaches
African-American baseball players
American expatriate baseball players in Canada
Baseball coaches from Pennsylvania
Baseball players from Philadelphia
Birmingham Barons players
Bowie Baysox players
Cedar Rapids Kernels players
Charlotte Rangers players
Danville Braves players
Eugene Emeralds players
Gulf Coast Braves players
Idaho Falls Braves players
Indianapolis Indians players
Jacksonville Suns players
Macon Braves players
Minor league baseball coaches
Omaha Royals players
Ottawa Lynx players
Texas Rangers players
Toledo Mud Hens players
Tulsa Drillers players
21st-century African-American sportspeople
20th-century African-American sportspeople